is a Nippon Professional Baseball pitcher for the Yomiuri Giants in Japan's Central League.

External links

Living people
1984 births
Baseball people from Osaka
Honolulu Sharks players
Nippon Professional Baseball pitchers
Osaka Kintetsu Buffaloes players
Tohoku Rakuten Golden Eagles players
Yomiuri Giants players
Japanese expatriate baseball players in the United States
Gigantes de Carolina players
Japanese expatriate baseball players in Puerto Rico